A girl is a young female human.

Girl or The Girl may also refer to:

Film
 Girl (1965 film), a Yugoslav film directed by Mladomir Puriša Đorđević
 Girl (1994 film), an Australian film directed by Peter Thompson
 Girl (1998 film), an American drama film starring Dominique Swain
 Girl (2018 film), a Belgian drama film
 Girl (2020 film), an American-Canadian thriller film
 Girl (2023 film), a British drama film
 The Girl (1987 film), a British-Swedish film directed by Arne Mattsson
 The Girl (2000 film), a French-American romantic drama film directed by Sande Zeig
 The Girl (2009 film), a Swedish drama film directed by Fredrik Edfeldt
 The Girl (2012 independent film), a film starring Abbie Cornish
 The Girl (2012 TV film), a British film directed by Julian Jarrold
 The Girl (2014 film), a Chinese romantic comedy film

Literature 
 Girl (comics), a set index article
 Girl (UK comics), a comic published by Hulton Press, 1951–1964
 Girl (Vertigo), a 1996 mini-series by Peter Milligan
 Girl Comics, a title from Timely Comics, Atlas Comics and Marvel Comics
 Girl (O'Brien novel), a 2019 novel by Edna O'Brien
 Girl (Nelson novel), a 1994 novel by Blake Nelson
 "Girl" (short story), a 1978 story by Jamaica Kincaid
 The Girl (novel), a 1978 novel by Meridel Le Sueur
 The Girl: A Life in the Shadow of Roman Polanski, a 2013 memoir by Samantha Geimer

Music 
 Girl (band), a 1979–1982 English glam metal band

Albums 
 Girl (Dannii Minogue album), 1997
 Girl (Eskimo Joe album), 2001
 Girl (Magic Dirt album), 2008
 Girl (Maren Morris album), 2019
 Girl (Pharrell Williams album), 2014
 The Girl (album), by Charlotte Perrelli, 2012

Songs 
 "Girl" (Beatles song), 1965
 "Girl" (Beck song), 2005
 "Girl" (Davy Jones song), 1971
 "Girl" (Destiny's Child song), 2005
 "Girl" (Maren Morris song), 2019
 "Girl" (Paul Wall song), 2006
 "Girl" (The Time song), 1982; written by Prince, who later recorded a different song with the same title (see below)
 "Girl" (William Wei song), 2015
 "Girl (Why You Wanna Make Me Blue)", by the Temptations, 1964
 "Girl", by Anouk from Hotel New York, 2004
 "Girl", by Baroque, 2016
 "Girl", by Built to Spill from The Normal Years, 1996
 "Girl", by Duffy from Endlessly, 2010
 "Girl", by Empire of the Sun from Walking on a Dream, 2008
 "Girl", by the Internet from Ego Death, 2015
 "Girl", by Jamie xx from In Colour, 2015
 "Girl", by Pat Benatar from Go, 2003
 "Girl", by Prince, B-side of the single "America", 1985
 "Girl", by Pseudo Echo from Love an Adventure, 1985
 "Girl", by the Records from Shades in Bed, 1979
 "Girl", by Robots in Disguise from Get RID!, 2005
 "Girl", by Stereophonics from Language. Sex. Violence. Other?, 2005
 "Girl", by Suicide from Suicide, 1977
 "Girl", by Tori Amos from Little Earthquakes, 1992
 "Girl (You Captivate Me)", by ? and the Mysterians from Action, 1967

Other uses 
 Girl (Chinese constellation)
 The Girl (TV series), a 2016 Colombian drama series
 Girl Skateboard Company, an American skateboard company
 Daughter

See also
 
 
 
 Girlhood (disambiguation)
 "Girlie" (song), by the Peddlers
 Girls (disambiguation)
 The Girls (disambiguation)